Saint-Martin-l'Ars is a commune in the Vienne department and Nouvelle-Aquitaine region of western France.

Geography
The Clouère flows north-northwest through the middle of the commune. The Clain flows northwest through the south-western part of the commune and crosses the village.

Geology and terrain
The commune is part of the region known as the Civraisien and has a beautiful landscape of hills.

Hydrography
202 ponds have been identified across the municipality (out of 30,000 recorded in the Poitou-Charentes region). They were created by humans, especially to meet the water needs of people (community ponds), livestock or after extraction (clay, marl, millstones). Rich in botanical life they play a major role for amphibians (newts, frogs), reptiles (snakes) and dragonflies. They are a symbolic element of the rural heritage and contribute greatly to the maintenance of biodiversity in both the plains and the woodlands.

Climate
The climate is oceanic with mild summers.

Toponymy
The village's name comes from Saint Martin of Vienne, bishop of Vienne in the 2nd century, the evangelist of Poitou. The suffix "ars" means "burnt".

Demographics

History
During World War II, the battle line crossed the commune, from 22 June 1940 to 1 March 1943, leaving the settlement in the free zone and a small part of the territory of the municipality in the occupied zone. On 14 July 1941, the population showed their strength of will by celebrating the National Day, which was banned in 1940, around a bonfire and singing the Marseillaise.

In 1945, to celebrate the liberation and return of the Republic, a lime tree was planted as a "tree of liberty".

Abbey of Notre-Dame de la Réau

The Abbey of Notre-Dame de la Réau, located on the left bank of the Clain in a secluded corner on the borders of Poitou and the Lower Marche, was founded in the 12th century by canons following the rule of St. Augustine.

It was a very important house, the influence of which, as a result of its many subsidiaries, extended far beyond the region as far as Anjou and Brittany. It was dissolved during the French Revolution.

Having reviewed the history and archaeological survey in 1937, François Eygun wrote in the Poitevin Press in 1970 that this was "one of the most prestigious monuments of the Haut-Poitou".

See also
Communes of the Vienne department

References

Communes of Vienne